Leon Stewart (born 21 July 1942) is a Guyanese cricketer. He played in six first-class matches for British Guiana in 1968/69 and 1969/70.

See also
 List of Guyanese representative cricketers

References

External links
 

1942 births
Living people
Guyanese cricketers
Guyana cricketers
Sportspeople from Georgetown, Guyana